Fear in the Night may refer to:

 Fear in the Night (1947 film), an American film directed by Maxwell Shane
 Fear in the Night (1972 film), a British film directed by Jimmy Sangster